Colanthelia is a genus of South American bamboo in the grass family, native to southern Brazil and northeastern Argentina.

Species
 Colanthelia burchellii (Munro) McClure - São Paulo
 Colanthelia cingulata (McClure & L.B.Sm.) McClure - Santa Catarina, Paraná, São Paulo
 Colanthelia distans (Trin.) McClure - Goiás
 Colanthelia intermedia (McClure & L.B.Sm.) McClure - Santa Catarina, São Paulo
 Colanthelia lanciflora (McClure & L.B.Sm.) McClure - Rio Grande do Sul, Paraná, São Paulo
 Colanthelia macrostachya (Nees) McClure - São Paulo, Rio de Janeiro
 Colanthelia rhizantha (Hack.) McClure - Rio Grande do Sul, Paraná, Misiones

References

Bambusoideae genera
Flora of South America
Bambusoideae